Hooster is a three piece rock band from Christchurch, New Zealand. The band released its first album, Rotate, in 2004.

The band won a recording grant in 2003, to record one song from New Zealand on air. In 2005, they went on to win a contest to be opening band at the Big Day Out Auckland music festival.

Line-up
The band's original members were:
Ed Loughnan – guitar and vocals
Kris Giles – bass guitar and vocals
Al Evans – drums

In 2004, Evans moved to a different city and was replaced by new drummer Kayne. Evans drums on all but one of the songs appearing on the recordings.

References

External links
Official Hooster web site

New Zealand rock music groups